Weston is a city in Lewis County, West Virginia, United States. The population was 3,943 at the 2020 census. It is the county seat of Lewis County, and home to the Museum of American Glass in West Virginia and the Trans-Allegheny Lunatic Asylum.

History
Weston was founded in 1818 as Preston; the name was changed to Fleshersville soon after, and then to Weston in 1819.  The city was incorporated in 1846.

Weston is the site of the former Trans-Allegheny Lunatic Asylum, a psychiatric hospital and National Historic Landmark which has been mostly vacant since its closure in 1994 upon its replacement by the nearby William R. Sharpe Jr. Hospital. Jackson's Mill, a childhood home of Stonewall Jackson, is approximately four miles (6 km) north of Weston; it has been operated as a 4-H facility since the 1920s and is also the site of conference center operated by the West Virginia University Extension Service. It is listed on the National Register of Historic Places as the Jackson's Mill State 4-H Camp Historic District.

Weston has two national historic districts: the Weston Downtown Historic District and Weston Downtown Residential Historic District. Other buildings on the National Register of Historic Places are the Jonathan M. Bennett House and the former Weston Colored School.

Geography

The city is crossed by Interstate 79, U.S. Route 19, U.S. Route 33 and U.S. Route 119.

Climate
The climate in this area is characterized by hot, humid summers and generally mild to cool winters.  According to the Köppen Climate Classification system, Weston has a humid subtropical climate, abbreviated "Cfa" on climate maps.

Demographics

2020 census 
As of the 2020 census, there were 3,952 people and 1,561 households residing in the city. There were 2,106 housing units in Weston. The racial makeup of the city was 93% White, 0.9% African American, 0.9% Asian, 0.1% Native American, 0.8% from other races, and 4.2% from two or more races. Hispanics or Latinos of any race were 1.8% of the population.

There were 1,561 households, of which 34.2% were married couples living together,  32.2% had a female householder with no spouse present, 23.7% had a male householder with no spouse present.The average household and family size was 3.33. The median age in the city was 39.7 years.

2010 census 
As of the census of 2010, there were 4,110 people, 1,811 households, and 1,082 families living in the city. The racial makeup of the city was 97.0% White, 0.8% African American, 0.7% Asian, and 1.5% from two or more races. Hispanic or Latino of any race were 1.3% of the population.

There were 1,811 households, of which 27.7% had children under the age of 18 living with them, 40.9% were married couples living together, 13.3% had a female householder with no husband present, 5.5% had a male householder with no wife present, and 40.3% were non-families. 33.7% of all households were made up of individuals, and 16.6% had someone living alone who was 65 years of age or older. The average household size was 2.27 and the average family size was 2.86.

The median age in the city was 41.4 years. 22% of residents were under the age of 18; 7.7% were between the ages of 18 and 24; 26.1% were from 25 to 44; 26.2% were from 45 to 64; and 18.1% were 65 years of age or older. The gender makeup of the city was 48.7% male and 51.3% female.

2000 census
As of the census of 2000, there were 4,317 people, 1,942 households, and 1,172 families living in the city. The population density was 2,533.5 inhabitants per square mile (980.5/km2). There were 2,222 housing units at an average density of 1,304.0 per square mile (504.7/km2). The racial makeup of the city was 98.24% White, 0.19% African American, 0.09% Native American, 0.72% Asian, 0.19% from other races, and 0.58% from two or more races. Hispanic or Latino of any race were 0.46% of the population.

There were 1,942 households, out of which 24.5% had children under the age of 18 living with them, 44.4% were married couples living together, 13.2% had a female householder with no husband present, and 39.6% were non-families. 34.7% of all households were made up of individuals, and 18.6% had someone living alone who was 65 years of age or older. The average household size was 2.22 and the average family size was 2.84.

In the city, the population was spread out, with 20.3% under the age of 18, 7.9% from 18 to 24, 27.1% from 25 to 44, 24.9% from 45 to 64, and 19.7% who were 65 years of age or older. The median age was 42 years. For every 100 females, there were 83.2 males. For every 100 females age 18 and over, there were 80.4 males.

The median income for a household in the city was $26,690, and the median income for a family was $33,783. Males had a median income of $27,988 versus $17,335 for females. The per capita income for the city was $14,089. About 15.1% of families and 18.8% of the population were below the poverty line, including 25.8% of those under age 18 and 9.3% of those age 65 or over.

Notable natives and residents

 Louis Bennett Jr., World War I flying ace
 William Thomas Bland, congressman
 Charlie Brown, World War II USAAF pilot
 Andrew Edmiston, Jr., congressman
 John William Hamilton, bishop
 Buddy Hayes, musician
 Rush D. Holt, Sr., senator
 Rush D. Holt, Jr., congressman
 Jason Koon, poker player
 Lewis Maxwell, congressman
 Alexander Scott Withers, author
 Fred Wyant, football player

References

External links

 
 Louis Bennett Public Library
 West Virginia Museum of American Glass
 The Weston Democrat, local newspaper

Glass museums and galleries in the United States
Cities in West Virginia
Cities in Lewis County, West Virginia
County seats in West Virginia